The 2005 European Athletics Junior Championships was the 18th edition of the biennial athletics competition for European under-20 athletes, which was held in Kaunas, Lithuania on 21–24 July.

Medal summary

Men

Women

Medal table

References

 Results at site European Athletics (Men)
 (Women)
European Junior Championships 2005. World Junior Athletics History. Retrieved on 2013-05-12.

European Athletics U20 Championships
International athletics competitions hosted by Lithuania
European Athletics Junior Championships
European Athletics Junior Championships
2005 in youth sport
Sports competitions in Kaunas